Isagarh tehsil is a fourth-order administrative and revenue division, a subdivision of third-order administrative and revenue division of Ashoknagar district of Madhya Pradesh.

Geography
Isagarh tehsil has an area of 1100.49 sq kilometers. It is bounded by Shivpuri district in the northwest, north and northeast, Chanderi tehsil in the east and southeast, Ashoknagar tehsil  in the south and Shadhora tehsil in the southwest and west.

See also 
Ashoknagar district

Citations

External links

Ashoknagar district